USS Willoughby has been the name of more than one United States Navy ship, and may refer to:

 , a patrol vessel in commission from 1918 to 1919
 USS Willoughby (AVP-57), a seaplane tender laid down in 1943 but converted into the motor torpedo tender  prior to completion
 , a motor torpedo boat tender in commission from 1944 to 1946

United States Navy ship names